Fashion in 15th-century Europe was characterized by a series of extremes and extravagances, from the voluminous robes called houppelandes with their sweeping floor-length sleeves to the revealing doublets and hose of Renaissance Italy. Hats, hoods, and other headdresses assumed increasing importance, and were draped, jewelled, and feathered.

As Europe continued to grow more prosperous, the urban middle classes, skilled workers, began to wear more complex clothes that followed, at a distance, the fashions set by the elites. It is in this time period that we begin to see fashion take on a temporal aspect. People could now be dated by their clothes, and being in "out of date" clothing became a new social concern. National variations in clothing seem on the whole to have increased over the 15th century.

General trends

New trends emerge among the Danes
The Lübeckian chronicler Arnold mocked changes in Danish attire he attributes to the increasing economic power of the Danes:

Historians conjecture that the raw materials used to make clothing changed along with the styles, from wool to linens, as well as the colors of the textiles, and the types of weave, from homespun grey woolens to imported red and darkly colored textiles.

Dominance of the Burgundian court
With England and France mired in the Hundred Years War and its aftermath and then the English Wars of the Roses through most of the 15th century, European fashion north of the Alps was dominated by the glittering court of the Duchy of Burgundy, especially under the fashion-conscious power-broker Philip the Good (ruled 1419–1469). Having added Holland and Flanders to their dominion, the Dukes of Burgundy had access to the latest fabrics of Italy and the East and to English wool exports through the great trading cities of Bruges and Antwerp. Purchases of fabrics through Italian merchants like the two cousins both named Giovanni Arnolfini amounted to a noticeable proportion of all government expenditure. Especially in Florence, where sumptuary laws prevented the citizens from wearing the most luxurious cloths on which the city's fortunes were built, the materials of men's clothing in particular often appear plain in paintings, but contemporaries who understood the difference in grades of cloth very well would have appreciated the beauty and great expense of a very fine grade.

Fabrics and fur

Wool was the most popular fabric for all classes by far, followed by linen and hemp. Wool fabrics were available in a wide range of qualities, from rough undyed cloth to fine, dense broadcloth with a velvety nap. High-value broadcloth was a backbone of the English economy and was exported throughout Europe. Wool fabrics were dyed in rich colours, notably reds, greens, golds, and blues, although the actual blue colour achievable with dyeing with woad (and less frequently indigo) could not match the characteristic rich lapis lazuli pigment blues depicted in contemporary illuminated manuscripts such as the Très Riches Heures du duc de Berry.

Silk weaving was well established around the Mediterranean by the beginning of the 15th century, and figured silks, often silk velvets with silver-gilt wefts, are increasingly seen in Italian dress and in the dress of the wealthy throughout Europe. Stately floral designs featuring a pomegranate or artichoke motif had reached Europe from China in the 14th century and became a dominant design in the Ottoman silk-producing cities of Istanbul and Bursa, and spread to silk weavers in Florence, Genoa, Venice, Valencia, and Seville in this period.

Fur was worn, mostly as a lining layer, by those who could afford it. The grey and white squirrel furs of the Middle Ages, vair and miniver, went out of style except at court, first for men and then for women; the new fashionable furs were dark brown sable and marten. Toward the end of the 15th century, wild animal furs such as lynx became popular. Ermine remained the prerogative and hallmark of royalty.

Slashing
Slashing is a decorative technique that involved making small cuts on the outer fabric of a garment in order to reveal the sometimes brightly colored inner garment or lining. It was performed on all varieties of clothing, both men's and women's. Contemporary chroniclers identify the source of the fashion for slashing garments to the actions of Swiss soldiers in the aftermath of the Battle of Grandson in 1476. Supposedly the Swiss plundered the rich fabrics of the Burgundian nobles and used the scraps to patch their tattered clothes. In reality, images appear of sleeves with a single slashed opening as early as the mid-15th century, although the German fashion for "many small all-over slits" may have begun here. Whatever its origin, the fad for multiple slashings spread to German Landsknechts and thence to France, Italy, and England, where it was to remain a potent current in fashionable attire into the mid-17th century.

A second result of the defeat at Grandson was the decline of Burgundy as a fount of culture and fashion. The heiress Mary of Burgundy married Maximilian I, Holy Roman Emperor but died young. In the last decade of the 15th century, Charles VIII of France invaded Italy and was briefly declared King of Naples. As a result, the French nobility were introduced to the fabrics and styles of Italy, which would combine with German influence to become mainstream fashion of the nobility in France (and later spread to England) in the first half of the 16th century.

Women's fashion

Gown, kirtle, and chemise

Women's fashions of the 15th century consisted of a long gown, usually with sleeves, worn over a kirtle or undergown, with a linen chemise or smock worn next to the skin. The sleeves were made detachable and were heavily ornamented. The long-waisted silhouette of the previous period was replaced by a high-waisted style with fullness over the belly, often confined by a belt. The wide, shallow scooped neckline was replaced by a V-neck, often cut low enough to reveal the decorated front of the kirtle beneath.

Various styles of overgowns were worn. The cotehardie fitted smoothly from the shoulders to the hips and then flared by means of inserted triangular gores. It featured sleeves tight to the elbow with hanging streamers or tippets. The tight fit was achieved with lacing or buttons. This style faded rapidly from fashion in favor of the houppelande, a full robe with a high collar and wide sleeves that had become fashionable around 1380 and remained so to mid-15th century. The later houppelande had sleeves that were snug at the wrist, making a full "bag" sleeve. The bag sleeve was sometimes slashed in the front to allow the lower arm to reach through.

Around 1450, the dress of northern Europe developed a low V-neck that showed a glimpse of the square-necked kirtle. The neckline could be filled in with a sheer linen partlet. Wide turn-backs like revers displayed a contrasting lining, frequently of fur or black velvet, and the sleeves might be cuffed to match. Sleeves were very long, covering half of the hand, and often highly decorated with embroidery. Fine sleeves were often transferred from one dress to another. The term robe déguisée was coined in the mid-1400s to describe garments reflecting the very latest fashions, a term which endured into the 16th century.

In Italy, the low scoop-neck of the early decades gave way to a neckline that was high in front with a lower V-neck at the back at mid-15th century. This was followed by a V-neckline that displayed the kirtle or gamurra (sometimes spelled camorra). Sleeveless overgowns such as the cioppa were popular, and the gamurra sleeves displayed were often of rich figured silks. The  was a lighter-weight undergown for summerwear. A sideless overgown called the giornea was worn with the gamurra or cotta. Toward the end of the period, sleeves were made in sections or panels and slashed, allowing the full chemise sleeves below to be pulled through in puffs along the arm, at the shoulder, and at the elbow. This was the beginning of the fashion for puffed and slashed sleeves that would last for two centuries.

The partlet, a separate item to fill in a low neckline, appeared in this period, usually of sheer fabric (linen or possibly silk) with an open V-neckline. Some partlets had a collar and a back similar to the upper part of a shirt. Burgundian partlets were usually depicted worn under the dress (but over the kirtle); in Italy the partlet seems to have been worn over the dress and could be pointed or cut straight across at the lower front.

Two uniquely Spanish fashions appeared from the 1470s. The earliest depictions of this garment come from Catalonia, where it was worn with pieced or slashed sleeves and the second new style, a chemise with trumpet sleeves, open and very wide at the wrist.

The sideless surcoat of the 14th century became fossilized as a ceremonial costume for royalty, usually with an ermine front panel (called a plackard or placket) and a mantle draped from the shoulders; it can be seen in variety of royal portraits and as "shorthand" to identify queens in illuminated manuscripts of the period.

Hairstyles and headdresses
A variety of hats and headdresses were worn in Europe in the 15th century. The crespine of Northern Europe, originally a thick hairnet or snood, had evolved into a mesh of jeweler's work that confined the hair on the sides of the head by the end of the 14th century. Gradually the fullness at the sides of head was pulled up to the temples and became pointed, like horns (à corné). By mid-15th century, the hair was pulled back from the forehead, and the crespine, now usually called a caul, sat on the back of the head. Very fashionable women shaved their foreheads and eyebrows. Any of these styles could be topped by a padded roll, sometimes arranged in a heart-shape, or a veil, or both. Veils were supported by wire frames that exaggerated the shape and were variously draped from the back of the headdress or covered the forehead.

Women also wore the chaperon, a draped hat based on the hood and liripipe, and a variety of related draped and wrapped turbans.

The most extravagant headdress of Burgundian fashion was the hennin, a cone or truncated-cone shaped cap with a wire frame covered in fabric and topped by a floating veil. Later hennins featured a turned-back brim, or were worn over a hood with a turned-back brim. Towards the end of the 15th century women's head-dresses became smaller, more convenient, and less picturesque. The gable hood, a stiff and elaborate head-dress, emerged around 1480 and was popular among elder ladies up until the mid 16th century.

Women of the merchant classes in Northern Europe wore modified versions of courtly hairstyles, with coifs or caps, veils, and wimples of crisp linen (often with visible creases from ironing and folding). A brief fashion added rows of gathered frills to the coif or veil; this style is sometimes known by the German name .

The general European convention of completely covering married women's hair was not accepted in warmer Italy. Italian women wore their hair very long, wound with ribbons or braided, and twisted up into knots of various shapes with the ends hanging free. The hair was then covered with sheer veils or small caps. Toward the 1480s women wore chin-length sections of hair in loose waves or ripples over the ears (a style that would inspire "vintage" hair fashions in the 1620s and '30s and again in the 1840s and 1850s). Blonde hair was considered desirable (by Botticelli for one), and visitors to Venice reported that ladies sat out in the sun on their terraces with their hair spread out around large circular disks worn like hats, attempting to bleach it in the sun. Chemical methods were also used.

Women's footwear
Women from the 14th century wore laced ankle-boots, which were often lined with fur. Later in the 15th century, women also wore what were called crakows or poulaines. They used pattens to protect their tight shoes.

Style gallery – Northern Europe 1400s–1440s

Image of Christine de Pisan in a cotehardie. She wears a wired "horned" headdress with a veil. France, 1410–1411.
Christine de Pisan presents her book to Queen Isabeau, who wears a figured houppelande lined in ermine with a broad collar and a heart-shaped headdress. Her books stress that women should dress appropriately to their station in life, as her own less sumptuous headdress here reflects.
This woman wears a houppelande of dark blue figured fabric with a narrow belt. Her hair is shaved back from her forehead, and she wears a blunt pointed cap (now over-restored), France or Flanders, c. 1410.
Modestly dressed woman wears a linen headdress and a grey houppelande lined in black fur confined with a belt at the high waist. Her veil is pinned to her cap, and has sharp creases from ironing, Netherlands, 1430.
Her red houppelande is lined in grey fur, 1439.
Houppelande with fur-lined bag sleeves, Bruges, 1443.
Two women at a baptism, Seven Sacraments Altarpiece (likely godmother and mother) wear heart-shaped headdresses with veils and belted, fur-lined gowns open at the front to display the chemises beneath, Burgundy, 1445–1450.
Isabella of Portugal, Duchess of Burgundy, wears an elaborate embroidered and jeweled headdress with a sheer veil. Her gown is made of an artichoke-patterned red velvet on a gold ground, lined with ermine, and laces at the front opening. She wears a sheer linen partlet and a checkered belt, c. 1445–1450.
Margaret of Anjou, Queen consort of Henry VI of England. She is wearing the close-fitting cotehardie with gold buttons and tight gold sleeves. Her red mantel is richly embroidered at the neck and clasped with a brooch.

Style gallery – Northern Europe 1450s–1470s

This Portrait of a Lady by Rogier van der Weyden shows the hair pulled smoothly back from her face and confined in a caul or early hennin beneath a sheer veil. The gown has a wide V-neckline that shows the dark kirtle beneath and is worn with a wide red belt and a sheer partlet at the neck, Netherlands.
Emilia in the garden by Boccaccio, shows the formal ermine-trimmed sideless surcoat that identifies royalty in illuminated manuscripts of this period, 1460.
Ladies in another illustration from Boccaccio wear tall steeple hennins with white veils. A long gown with a train has fur at the cuffs and neckline and is worn with a wide belt, c. 1460.
An attendant in the same illustration wears a red hood with a long liripipe. Her blue dress is "kirtled" or shortened by poufing it over a belt, c. 1460.
Woman wears a simple headdress of draped linen and a red houppelande trimmed with white fur. Note that the sleeve is only attached to the dress at the top, 1467–1471.
Maria Portinari wears a truncated cone hennin with a veil draped over the back. The black loop on her forehead is thought to be part of the wire frame that balances the hennin. Her houppelande has a black collar trimmed in white fur and she wears an elaborate carcanet or necklace, Netherlands, 1478–1478.
Elizabeth Woodville, Queen consort of Edward IV of England, wears a black gown with patterned collar and cuffs and a matching truncated English hennin beneath a sheer veil. ?1470s.

Style gallery – Northern Europe 1480s–1490s

Mary Magdalene is portrayed in contemporary dress of 1480. The low front opening now laces over the kirtle or an inserted panel or plackard, and the gown is draped up to reveal the richer fabric of the kirtle skirt.
Long gowns of the 1480s are carried looped up to allow walking, displaying the kirtle beneath.
In this allegory of True Love, the woman wears a pointed hennin with a sheer veil. Her gown is laced across her kirtle, Netherlands, 1485–1490.
Anne de Beaujeu, Regent of France, in the ceremonial ermine-trimmed sideless surcoat and mantle of royalty, c. 1490s. The small cap worn with her coronet is a new French fashion of the last decade of the 15th century.
Margaret of Austria wears a red velvet front-opening gown lined in ermine. Her hood has black velvet lappets and gold embroidery, 1490s.
Hypsipylé, first wife of Jason is depicted wearing an embroidered coif or cap decorated with small slashes, with her hair braided down her back underneath. She wears a square-necked dress with flared sleeves, French, 1496–1498.
Another fashionable headdress of this period features a striped veil wrapped over an embroidered padded roll with a jewel, worn over a coif tied under the chin. The portion over the brow is probably a matching "forehead cloth" rather than part of the coif. The loose, square-necked gown of figured silk is worn over a black partlet, French, 1496–1498.
Juana I of Castile is depicted in the royal ermine-trimmed sideless surcoat and a symbolic mantle with heraldic decoration.
Woman with an elaborated braided hairstyle, 1497.
Women with dresses and underskirts, 1496-1499.

Style gallery – Italy 1400s–1460s

Italian headdresses. The woman on the left wears a veil twisted into a turban. The woman on the right has her hair held in a long, thick braid encased in sheer fabric and twisted around her head. Her simple gown laces up the front with a single lace, 1423.
Woman at a casement wears a fur-lined red gown with a belt at the high waistline and full slashed sleeves over dark patterned undersleeves gathered to the elbow. Her headdress features a red chaperon, Florence, c. 1440.
She is wearing a high-waisted gown of embroidered gold with tight-fitting sleeves. Her blonde hair is partially covered by a long black veil.
Italian sleeveless gown of mid-15th century has an obvious waist seam and a skirt pleated to the bodice. The figured undergown has a high front neckline and wide upper sleeves. Her hair is lightly covered with a cap and veil twisted into a turban.
Battista Sforza, Duchess of Urbino wears her hair wrapped in ribbon which is coiled at her ears and covered with a ruched veil. Her black gown is high necked in front and lower at the back, typical of Italian fashion at this time, and is worn with floral sleeves, probably attached to an underdress, 1465–1470.
Italian fresco showing women with their hair braided or twisted, and wrapped around their heads, secured with ribbons laced through the coils, 1468–1470.

Style gallery – Italy and Spain 1470s–1490s

Florentine woman wears sleeves of figured silk with the fashionable pomegranate motif, 1470.
Simonetta Vespucci wears her very long hair in a knot at the back with a tail wrapped in black cord or ribbons. A single braid is studded with pearls, and a long loose lock is looped over the braid. Her neckline is lower and squared, 1476–1480.
Princess Salome and her attendants are pictured in Catalan dress of the 1470s. The flaring chemise sleeves of striped or embroidered fabric are uniquely Spanish at this time, but the small cap and wrapped braid of hair are common to both Spain and Italy.
1490 portrait of a lady features the sheer pointed partlet worn over the gown that was popular in Italy at this time. This woman wears a small cap with a brim on the back of her head; it ties under her chin.
Neroccio di Bartolomeo de' Landi's "Lady" wears a V-necked, high-waisted gown with hanging sleeves over a floral silk gamurra with a square neckline. Her cap is of the same floral silk. Siena, c. 1490.
Two Venetian ladies with blonde frizzy hair and caps. The very high waist is typical of Venice. Note the chopines or platform shoes to the left. As with other similar pictures, historians argue as to whether these are patrician ladies or courtesans.
Isabella of Castille in her crown wears a gown with long hanging sleeves over pieced and jewelled undersleeves and a gold brocade kirtle. Her companion (probably her daughter Juana or Joanna) wears undersleeves fastened up the back over full chemise sleeves. Her red gown is open from the waist down in back and has very long hanging sleeves, one of which is looped up over her right shoulder. Her hair is braided and wrapped with a knot or tassel at the end. Spain, 1490–1495.
Leonardo da Vinci's La Belle Ferronière wears her long hair smoothed over her ears and pulled back into a braid. Her sleeves are tied to her gown, and the chemise beneath is pulled out in puffs between the ribbon ties. The puffs and the lower waist would be important fashion trends in the next decades.

Men's fashion

Shirt, doublet, and hose
The basic costume of men in this period consisted of a shirt, doublet, and hose, with some sort of overrobe (robe worn over clothing).

Linen shirts were worn next to the skin. Toward the end of the period, shirts (French chemise, Italian camicia, Spanish camisa) began to be full through the body and sleeves with wide, low necklines; the sleeves were pulled through the slashings or piecing of the doublet sleeves to make puffs, especially at the elbow and the back of the arm. As the cut of doublets revealed more fabric, wealthy men's shirts were often decorated with embroidery or applied braid.

Over the shirt was worn a doublet. From around the mid-15th century very tight-fitting doublets, belted or tailored to be tight at the waist, giving in effect a short skirt below, were fashionable, at least for the young. Sleeves were generally full, even puffy, and when worn with a large chaperon, the look was extremely stylish, but very top-heavy. Very tight hose, and long pointed shoes or thigh-boots gave a long attenuated appearance below the waist, and a chunky, solid one above. The doublet was often elaborately pleated, especially at the back, the pleats being achieved by various means. In Italy both shirt and doublet were often high, tight and collarless at the front of the neck; sometimes they are shown higher at the front than the back.

Men of all classes wore short braies or breeches, a loose undergarment, usually made of linen, which was held up by a belt. Hose or chausses made out of wool were used to cover the legs, and were generally brightly colored. Early hose sometimes had leather soles and were worn without shoes or boots. Hose were generally tied to the breech belt, or to the breeches themselves, or to a doublet.

As doublets became shorter, hose reached to the waist rather than the hips, and were sewn together into a single garment with a pouch or flap to cover the front opening; this evolved into the codpiece.

The hose exposed by short tops were, especially in Italy late in the 15th century, often strikingly patterned, parti-coloured (different colours for each leg, or vertically divided), or embroidered. Hose were cut on the cross-grain or bias for stretch.

Overrobes and outerwear
It was essentially a robe with fullness falling from the shoulders in organ pleats and very full sleeves often reaching to the floor with, at the start of the 16th century, a high collar. The houppelande could be lined in fur, and the hem and sleeves might be dagged or cut into scallops. It was initially often worn belted, but later mostly hanging straight. The length of the garment shortened from around the ankle to above the knee over this period. The floor-length sleeves were later wrist-length but very full, forming a bag or sack sleeve, or were worn off the arm, hanging ornamentally behind.

A sideless tunic or tabard, called a giornea in Italy and a journade in France, was popular. It was usually pleated and was worn hanging loose or belted. Young men wore them short and older men wore them calf- or ankle-length.

The middle of the 15th century in Burgundy saw what seems to have been the earliest occurrence of the male fashion for dressing all in black, which was to reappear so strongly in the "Spanish" style of the mid-16th–17th century and again in the 19th–20th centuries. This was apparently begun by Duke Philip the Good.

In Venice, the patrician class, after the age of joining the Great Council, wore their long red robes as a uniform virtually unchanged throughout the 15th century. In contrast, the young men and the famous courtesans of the city dressed very extravagantly.

In the last decades of the 15th century, a new style of overgown appeared; this was of various lengths, generally worn unbelted, and featured wide turned back revers and collar.

Short or long cloaks or mantles were worn overall for ceremonial occasions and in bad weather; these typically fastened on one shoulder.

Headgear
Early in the 15th century, the hood remained a common component of dress for all classes, although it was frequently worn around the neck as a cowl or twisted into the fantastical shapes of the chaperon. Hats of various styles—tall-crowned with small brims or no brims at all, hats with brims turned up on one side for variations of the coif, or low-crowned with wider brims pulled to a point in front—began to compete with the draped chaperon, especially in Italy. A brimless scarlet cap became nearly universal for young Florentines in particular, and was widely worn by older men and those in other cities.

In mid-15th century, a bowl haircut with the hair shaved at the back of the neck was stylish. In Germany, and briefly in Venice, a wide shock of frizzy blond hair was often seen on images of lovers (and angels) in the later part of the 15th century—less often in portraits. By the end of the 15th century, shoulder-length hair became fashionable, a trend that would continue into the early 16th century.

Style gallery 1400–1450

The lord on the left wears a long figured houppelande with full sleeves lined in fur, while the men of his household wear short solid-coloured overrobes with parti-coloured or matching hose. Several of the men wear hoods around their necks, and some wear hats. France, Livre de Chasse, 1405–1410.
John the Fearless (d. 1419), Duke of Burgundy and father of Philip the Good, wears a fur-lined black houppelande with high neck and dagged sleeves over a red doublet. His bag-shaped hat has a rolled brim and is decorated with a jewel. Early 15th century.
Young man wears a draped chaperon and a dark robe over a reddish doublet. Note the characteristic high front neckline compared to the back neckline, Florence, 1425.
A chaperon worn in elaborate twists, 1433.
John of Fond Memory (d. 1433), King of Portugal, wears a red fur-lined houppelande over a patterned doublet and a black bonnet.
Chancellor Rolin wears a bold floral patterned robe with fur trim and bag sleeves. The "bowl" haircut with the back of the neck shaved was popular in mid-15th century.
Hose or chausses worn with braies and tied to a belt, 1440.
Back view of a knee-length Italian  or houppelande of figured silk. One sleeve is turned back to the shoulder to reveal the lining and the doublet sleeve beneath. Sienna, 1442.
Philip the Good, Duke of Burgundy, wears an elaborately draped chaperon with a black-on-black figured silk short robe with width at the shoulder, 1447–1448.

Style gallery 1450–1500

Back view of the conjoined hose of the 15th century. The man on the right has slashed undersleeves. Note V-shaped back neckline, 1460s.
France, late 1460s Short doublet, heavily pleated, with chaperon and thigh boots.
Antoine, Bastard of Burgundy, all in black, wears a soft "sugarloaf" hat and a doublet laced at the neck with a collar. He wears the emblem of the Order of the Golden Fleece around his neck, 1467–1470.
A prince (right) wears a long floral patterned robe, while his attendants wear very short doublets with hose. All wear long pointed shoes, France, 1468–1470.
Parti-coloured hose are worn with a sideless tabard belted at the waist. Italy, c. 1470.
Giuliano de' Medici wears the high collarless Italian style at the neck, 1478.
Maarten van Nieuvenhove wears an open robe fastened across his chest with pairs of ribbon ties. Beneath the overgown he wears a brown velvet doublet with sleeves buttoned to the wrist. Bruges, 1487.
At the very end of the 15th century, Albrecht Dürer's self-portrait shows the influence of Italian fashion: His low-necked shirt or chemise of fine linen, gathered and trimmed with a band of gold braid or embroidery, is worn under an open-fronted doublet and a cloak tied over one shoulder. His hair is worn long, under a draped pointed hat with a tassel, 1498.

Children's fashion

Charles, 6th Dauphin, drawn after his tomb effigy. He is wearing a herigaut with tucked sleeves.
Charles, son of Philip III of Burgundy, wears a gold floral figured short robe, black hose, and pointed shoes with pattens underneath, and a "pudding-basin" haircut 1447–1448.
Young boy holding a teething ring wears a short robe with a sash and open-toed shoes, Italy, 1461.
Two Gonzaga princes wear the family colours with parti-coloured hose with ornamental points (laces).
Margherita Portinari, a banker's daughter of Bruges, wears a green dress laced up the front with a single lace over a dark kirtle. Her hair is worn loose under a black cap with a pendant jewel, Netherlands, 1476–1478.
Children's clothing during the Italian Renaissance reflected that of their parents. In other words, kids dressed exactly like the adults and looked like miniature versions of them. As babies and toddlers, children were all put in dresses to make the potty training process easier for parents or maids. Then, around the age of 6 or 7, boys would receive their first pair of hose (called breeching).

Working class clothing

Older huntsmen wear looser robes belted at the waist while younger men wear fashionable short robes fitted through the body and belted at the hip. The higher-ranking figures wear less practical clothes and chaperons, Livre de Chasse.
Peasant reaping in linen braies and shirt, Très Riches Heures du Duc de Berry, c 1412–1416.
Man and woman shearing sheep. She wears a black hood with a long liripipe and a scrip or bag at her waist. He wears a floppy black hat tied under the chin, Les Très Riches Heures du duc de Berry.
Women raking hay work barefoot and wear their kirtles looped up over long-sleeved linen smocks, Les Très Riches Heures du duc de Berry.
Workmen on a dock wear short robes with hats, Italy, Angelico, 1437.
The very poor of Florence receive alms in well-worn and basic versions of the clothes of the more prosperous.
Workman shown fastening of the hose to the short doublet by means of points or ties, Bosch 1475–1480.
Venetian gondoliers wear open-fronted, slashed doublets and hose divided into upper and lower sections, 1494.
German peasants, 1496-97.

See also

Byzantine dress
Escoffion - horned headdress

See also
 1300–1400 in European fashion
1500–1550 in Western European fashion
1550–1600 in Western European fashion

Notes

References
Black, J. Anderson, and Madge Garland: A History of Fashion, 1975, 
Boucher, François: 20,000 Years of Fashion, Harry Abrams, 1966
Condra, Jill: The Greenwood Encyclopedia of Clothing Through World History, Greenwood Publishing, 2008, 
Crowfoot, Elizabeth, Frances Prichard and Kay Staniland, Textiles and Clothing c. 1150 -c. 1450, Museum of London, 1992, 
Favier, Jean, Gold and Spices: The Rise of Commerce in the Middle Ages, London, Holmes and Meier, 1998, 
Kõhler, Carl: A History of Costume, Dover Publications reprint, 1963, from 1928 Harrap translation from the German, 
Koslin, Désirée and Janet E. Snyder, eds.: Encountering Medieval Textiles and Dress: Objects, texts, and Images, Macmillan, 2002, 
Laver, James: The Concise History of Costume and Fashion, Abrams, 1979
 Mentges, Gabriele: European Fashion (1450–1950), European History Online, Mainz: Institute of European History, 2011, retrieved: June 16, 2011.
Payne, Blanche: History of Costume from the Ancient Egyptians to the Twentieth Century, Harper & Row, 1965. No ISBN for this edition; ASIN B0006BMNFS
Tortora, Phyllis and Keith Eubank. Survey of Historic Costume, 2nd Edition. Fairchild Publications, 1994. 
Van Buren, Anne H. Illuminating Fashion: Dress in the Art of Medieval France and the Netherlands, 1325-1515. New York: Morgan Library & Museum, 2011.

Further reading
Newman, Paul B.: Daily Life in the Middle Ages

External links
Late Medieval clothing and embroidery
Late 15th century Italian (Venice) Velvet at the Metropolitan Museum of Art
15th Century Female Flemish Dress: A Portfolio of Images, by Hope Greenberg
Women's Clothing in 15th Century Florence
Burgundian wedding c1470, from the Getty
Burgundian women's dress including Images of Burgundian hennins
Men's clothing in 15th century Florence
Glossary of some medieval clothing terms 
Article on Burgundian women's dress

15th-century fashion
History of clothing (Western fashion)
Medieval European costume
Fashion